Planicoxa is a genus of advanced iguanodontian dinosaur from the Early Cretaceous of North America. It is known from the partial skeletons of several individual specimens. Its fossils were discovered in Utah, United States.

The type species for the genus is Planicoxa venenica, first described by Tony DiCroce and Kenneth Carpenter in 2001. Its discovery was made in the Poison Strip Sandstone Member of the Cedar Mountain Formation in Grand County, Utah, United States. The generic name, Planicoxa, which means "flat hip", refers to the flat appearance of the ilium formed by horizontal folding over of the postacetabular process (rear portion of the ilium), the defining characteristic of the genus; venenica, the specific name, is Latin for "poison" in reference to the Poison Strip Sandstone Member of the Cedar Mountain Formation where the discovery was made. The taxon is represented by a well-preserved ilium, femora, tibiae, and vertebrae, as well as other material. The femora are standard for ornithopods, but the ilium has a short, horizontal postacetabular process that is functionally an antitrochanter. The discovery of P. venenica added significant information to the Barremian-Albian fauna of the Cedar Mountain Formation.

A second species, P. depressa, was created by Carpenter and Wilson (2008) for material previously named Camptosaurus depressus by Charles Gilmore in 1909. That material was collected from the Lakota Formation near the town of Hot Springs, South Dakota. It too has the odd flat ilium formed by the horizontal postacetabular process. This species differs from P. venenica in that the ilium is not as arched, has a thicker (more robust) preacetabular process (long, forward projection of the ilium), a shallower acetabular notch (hip-socket), and a proportionally narrower brevis shelf (a shelf for muscles on the inside of the rear part of the ilium). It is known from some vertebrae and two ilia. Isolated iguanodontid bones from the Lakota Formation probably belong to this species. In 2011, it was assigned to its own genus, Osmakasaurus.

References

 DiCroce, T. and K. Carpenter. (2001). "New ornithopod from the Cedar Mountain Formation (Lower Cretaceous) of Eastern Utah". pp. 183–196 in: Tanke, D. & K. Carpenter (eds.)  Mesozoic Vertebrate Life. Indiana University Press, Bloomington.
 Carpenter, K. and Wilson, Y. (2008). "A new species of Camptosaurus (Ornithopoda: Dinosauria) from the Morrison Formation (Upper Jurassic) of Dinosaur National Monument, Utah, and a biomechanical analysis of its forelimb". Annals of the Carnegie Museum 76:227-263.

Early Cretaceous dinosaurs of North America
Fossil taxa described in 2001
Iguanodonts
Taxa named by Kenneth Carpenter
Paleontology in Utah
Paleontology in South Dakota
Ornithischian genera